The Charles and Fae Olson House is a historic house in Gresham, Oregon, United States. Designed and hand-built by the novice owner-occupant as his version of the "dream house" that sustained many men and women overseas during World War II, its modern styling embodies the breaks with tradition embraced by the generation returning from the war. The main outlines of the plan were developed during mail correspondence between Charles Olson and his wife Fae while he was serving in the Pacific, and many features are patterned on the books and magazines available to him. The Olsons' willingness to devote their own labor to its construction allowed them to avoid the constraints of commercial and government financing, which favored standardized suburban tract construction during the immediate postwar period, and to flexibly adapt to the material shortages of the time.

The house was added to the National Register of Historic Places in 2007.

See also
National Register of Historic Places listings in Multnomah County, Oregon

References

External links

1946 establishments in Oregon
Buildings and structures in Gresham, Oregon
Houses completed in 1957
Houses in Multnomah County, Oregon
Houses on the National Register of Historic Places in Oregon
Modern Movement architecture in the United States
National Register of Historic Places in Gresham, Oregon